The Heinkel He 219 Uhu ("Eagle-Owl") is a night fighter that served with the German Luftwaffe in the later stages of World War II. A relatively sophisticated design, the He 219 possessed a variety of innovations, including Lichtenstein SN-2 advanced VHF-band intercept radar, also used on the Ju 88G and Bf 110G night fighters. It was also the first operational military aircraft to be equipped with ejection seats and the first operational German World War II-era aircraft with tricycle landing gear. Had the Uhu been available in quantity, it might have had a significant effect on the strategic night bombing offensive of the Royal Air Force; however, only 294 of all models were built by the end of the war and these saw only limited service. Ernst-Wilhelm Modrow was the leading night fighter ace on the He 219. Modrow was credited with 33 of his 34 night air victories on the type.

Design and development
Development and production of the He 219 was protracted and tortuous, due to political rivalries between Josef Kammhuber, commander of the German night fighter forces, Ernst Heinkel, the manufacturer and Erhard Milch, responsible for aircraft construction in the Reichsluftfahrtministerium (RLM – the German Aviation Ministry). The aircraft was also complicated and expensive to build; these factors further limited the number of aircraft produced.

When engineer Robert Lusser returned to Heinkel from Messerschmitt, he began work on a new high-speed bomber project called P.1055. This was an advanced design with a pressurized cockpit, twin ejection seats (the first to be planned for use in any combat aircraft), tricycle landing gear – featuring a nose gear that rotated its main strut through 90° during retraction (quickly orienting the nosewheel into the required horizontal position for stowage within the nose, only at the very end of the retraction cycle) to fit flat within the forward fuselage, and remotely controlled, side-mounted FDSL 131 defensive gun turrets similar to those used by the Messerschmitt Me 210. Power was to be provided by two of the potentially troublesome, dual-crankcase DB 610 "power system" engines which had started their development in June 1940, weighing on the order of about 1– tonnes apiece, producing (2,950 PS/2,910 hp) each, delivering excellent performance with a top speed of approximately 750 km/h (470 mph) and a 4,000 km (2,500 mi) range with a 2,000 kg (4,410 lb) bomb load.

The RLM rejected the design in August 1940 as too complex and risky. Lusser quickly offered four versions of the fighter with various wingspans and engine choices in order to balance performance and risk. At the same time, he offered the P.1056, a night fighter with four 20 mm cannon in the wings and fuselage. The RLM rejected all of these on the same grounds in 1941. Heinkel was furious and fired Lusser on the spot.

About the same time as Lusser was designing the P.1055, Kammhuber had started looking for an aircraft for his rapidly growing night fighter force. Heinkel quickly re-designed the P.1055 for this role as the P.1060. This design was similar in layout but somewhat smaller and powered by two of the largest displacement (at 44.5 litres/2,700 cu. in.) single-block liquid-cooled aviation engines placed in mass production in Germany, the DB 603 inverted V12 engine. As designed by Heinkel, these engines' nacelle accommodations featured annular radiators similar to the ones on the Jumo 211-powered Junkers Ju 88A, but considerably more streamlined in appearance, and which, after later refinement to their design, were likely to have been unitized as a Heinkel-specific Kraftei engine unit-packaging design. Nearly identical-appearance nacelles, complete with matching annular radiators, were also used on the four prototype He 177B prototype airframes built in 1943–44, and the six ordered prototypes of Heinkel's He 274 high-altitude strategic bombers with added turbochargers. The early DB 603 subtypes had poor altitude performance, which was a problem for Heinkel's short-winged design, but Daimler had a new "G" subtype of the DB 603 powerplant meant to produce 1,400 kW (1,900 PS) take-off power apiece under development to remedy the problem. Heinkel was sure he had a winner and sent the design off to the RLM in January 1942, while he funded the first prototype himself. The RLM again rejected the He 219, in favour of new Ju 88- and Me 210-based designs.

Construction of the prototype started in February 1942 but suffered a serious setback in March, when Daimler said that the DB 603G engine would not be ready in time. Instead, they would deliver a 603A engine with a new gear ratio to the propellers, as the DB 603C with the choice of using four-blade propellers, as the similarly-powered Fw 190C high-altitude fighter prototypes were already starting to use into early 1943, with the DB 603. DB 603 engines did not arrive until August 1942 and the prototype did not fly until 6 November 1942. When Kammhuber saw the prototype on 19 November, he was so impressed that he immediately ordered it into production over Milch's objections. Milch—who had rejected the He 219 in January—was enraged.

Stability problems with the aircraft were noted but Heinkel overcame these by offering a cash prize to engineers who could correct them. Further changes were made to the armament during the development of the prototype He 219V-series. The dorsal rear defensive guns—mounted atop the fuselage and firing directly rearward from a fixed, internally mounted, rear-facing dorsal "step" position, at a point just aft of the wing trailing edge – were removed due to their ineffectiveness. The forward-firing armament complement of the aircraft was increased to two Mauser MG 151/20 20 mm autocannon in the wing roots, inboard of the propeller arcs to avoid the need for gun synchronizers, with four more MG 151/20 autocannon mounted in the ventral fuselage tray, which had originally ended in a rearwards-facing "step" similar to and located directly under the deleted rear dorsal "step" – this rearwards-facing feature was also deleted for similar reasons. The A-0 model featured a bulletproof shield, that could be raised in the front interior cockpit, hiding the entire bottom portion of the windscreen, providing temporary pilot protection and leaving a sighting slot by which the gunsight could be aimed at a bomber. Production prototypes were then ordered as the He 219 A-0 and quickly progressed to the point where V7, V8 and V9 were handed over to operational units in June 1943 for testing.

The earlier prototypes, with four-blade propellers for their DB 603 engines (also used on the Fw 190C prototypes, with the same DB 603 engine) had blunt, compound-curvature metal nose cones also used for production-series He 219A airframes. The initial examples of these nose cones possessed cutouts for their use with the quartet of forward-projecting masts for the Matratze 32-dipole radar antennae on the noses of at least the first five prototypes, used with the early UHF-band Lichtenstein B/C or C-1 radar installation. These early He 219V-series prototype airframes also had cockpit canopies that did not smoothly taper aftwards on their upper profile, as on the later production He 219A-series airframes, but instead ended in a nearly hemispherically-shaped enclosure. The "V4" (fourth) prototype, equipped with the earlier canopy design, had a small degree of internal metal framing within the rearmost hemispherical canopy glazing, apparently for a rear dorsal weapons mount or sighting gear for the deleted fixed "step"-mount rearwards-firing armament. The idea for the rear-facing dorsal and ventral "step" features on the original He 219 fuselage design, for armament emplacement locations was later carried into the May 1943 revised fuselage design, for what became the Heinkel Amerikabomber design contract competitor, the He 277, for its revised fuselage design to accommodate a tricycle undercarriage. The Heinkel engineering department's Typenblatt general arrangement drawing for a BMW 801E-powered, tricycle-gear He 277 Amerikabomber design show the early He 219 V-series' rearwards-facing "steps" being inherited by the He 277's revised fuselage design in similar locations on its aft fuselage. The adoption of the pair of He 219 prototype rear-fuselage "step" features relocated the ventral emplacement rearwards by two meters, to provide space for the He 277's nosewheel configuration's seven-meter long bomb bay. The adopted "step" locations provided for the Amerikabomber's dorsal and ventral, generally rearwards-firing aft fuselage turrets, with each turret placed at the position of the "step" features, being armed with a pair of MG 151/20 cannon apiece.

Milch repeatedly tried to have the He 219 program cancelled and in the process, Kammhuber was removed from office. Production ceased for a time, but was restarted because the new Junkers Ju 388s were taking too long to get into service.

Operational history
The He 219 had an auspicious combat debut. On the night of 11–12 June 1943, Werner Streib flew the V9 and shot down five bombers between 01:05 and 02:22 hours, before crashing on landing. Claims have been made that, "In the next ten days the three Heinkel He 219A-0 pre-production aircraft [shot] down a total of 20 RAF aircraft, including six of the previously "untouchable" de Havilland Mosquito fighter-bombers. Greatly encouraged, Kammhuber continued to press for immediate production." No record of corresponding Mosquito losses or any documentary evidence exists that He 219 pilots claimed six Mosquitos. Indeed in the opinion the famous test pilot Capt. Eric Brown - who flew several He 219 A-2s after the war - the He219 was "decidedly underpowered" (his italics) and the "rate of climb was certainly unimpressive" and found it to be "short on performance to deal with the Mosquito".

The first major production series was the He 219 A-0, although initially the pre-production series, it matured into a long running production series, due to numerous changes incorporated into the design, along with the cancellation of several planned variants. Production problems as a result of Allied bombing in March meant the A-0 did not reach Luftwaffe units until October 1943. The A-0 was usually armed with two 20 mm MG 151/20 cannon in the wing roots and up to four 20 mm or 30 mm cannon in a ventral weapons bay. The first 10–15 aircraft were delivered with the 490 MHz UHF-band FuG 212 "Lichtenstein" C-1 radar with a 4 × 8-dipole element Matratze antenna array. 104 He 219 A-0s were built until the summer of 1944, the majority of them at EHW (Ernst Heinkel Wien) or Heinkel-Süd in Wien-Schwechat.

The first planned version to reach production was the He 219 A-2 model, which had longer engine nacelles containing extra fuel tanks, unitized 1670 PS DB 603AA engines with higher critical altitude and often also two 30 mm (1.18 in) MK 108 cannon, as an offensive Schräge Musik upward-firing system completely contained within the rear fuselage, with the cannons' muzzles even with the dorsal fuselage surface. With Schräge Musik, the ventral weapons bay held two cannon due to space limitations. The A-2 featured an updated, 90 MHz VHF-band Telefunken FuG 220 Lichtenstein SN-2 radar system, complete with its larger, high-drag 4 × 2-dipole element Hirschgeweih aerials. It initially had a longer minimum range than the C-1 radar, but had improved accuracy and resolution and was also less vulnerable to chaff jamming. Through the late summer of 1944, a total of 85 He 219 A-2s were built until November 1944, most at EHR (Ernst Heinkel Rostock) or Heinkel-Nord in Rostock-Marienehe (now Rostock-Schmarl).

The He 219 was a capable fighter aircraft and the pilots were free to hunt down any detected Allied bombers. Ground control sent the aircraft into the right area, where the pilots took over and guided themselves towards the bombers with the Lichtenstein VHF radar's information. The SN-2 radar's 4 km (3 mi) maximum detection range was greater than the distance between the bombers. While the performance of the A-2 was not extraordinary—approximately 580 km/h (360 mph) speed—it was enough of an advance over the Messerschmitt Bf 110Gs and Dornier Do 217Ns, for the crew to chase several bombers in a single sortie.

To improve its ability to intercept the Mosquito, the He 219 had excess weight removed. With some weapon and radio systems removed, the aircraft was able to attain a speed of 650 km/h (400 mph). This version was given the designation A-6. None of these were produced, but similar weight saving measures could be undertaken at the unit level.

The last major production version was the A-7 with improved, unitized DB 603E engines. The A-7 typically had two 20 mm MG 151/20 cannon in the wing roots (inboard of the propeller arcs), two 20 mm MG 151/20 in the ventral weapons bay and two 30 mm (1.18 in) MK 108s as rear-fuselage dorsal mount, upwards-firing Schräge Musik offensive ordnance. Production of 210 aircraft was to start November/December 1944, but the number produced is not known as original documents have been lost or contained no sub-version number.

Further developments

The follow-on series to the He 219As in service was to be the He 219B fitted with the new, but troublesome 1,864 kW (2,500 hp) Junkers Jumo 222A/B 24-cylinder engines – a multibank, liquid-cooled inline engine, with six rows of cylinder blocks having four cylinders each—which would have allowed the He 219 to reach 700 km/h (440 mph), each of which were almost the same displacement in their A/B (supercharged) and E/F (supercharged with intercoolers) versions and each only very slightly heavier, compared to the Double Wasp radial engines in the American P-61 night fighter. The He 219B wing was also to have had an increased span of 22.06 m (72.38 ft), for better high altitude performance. The Jumo 222 did not reach production status, with just under 300 examples built in at least three differing displacement sizes. Only a few test machines were ever fitted for the engines; some additional airframes were built with the enlarged wing. These examples were slated to fly with high-altitude versions of the standard DB 603 powerplants in place of the troubled Jumo 222 multibank powerplants, but only one or two test machines ever flew with them.

A further adaptation would have been the He 219C, also intended to use the B-series design's big wing and Jumo 222 powerplants as well as an all-new fuselage of 17.15 m (56.27 ft), with a complete three-man Ju 388J cockpit section forward, converted to accept the He 219A's standard nose gear layout (the Ju 388 itself used the Ju 88's conventional gear design), the Borsig-designed Hecklafette HL 131V "quadmount", hydraulic-powered four-gun manned tail turret intended for later He 177A versions and the He 177B-5, as well as more than one Amerikabomber strategic bomber design competitor. Day bomber and night fighter versions were proposed and metal was cut for the project but, without the over-1,500-kW output Jumo 222 engines getting out of their strictly experimental status, they never flew.

Paper projects include the very-high-altitude He 219E with a vastly increased wingspan of 28.5 m (93.5 ft) and 1,500 kW (2,000 PS) output rated DB 614 engines, which were apparently a further-uprated version of the never-produced DB 603G inverted V12, capable of the desired 1,491 kW (2,000 hp) power output level that Germany had so much trouble crafting into combat-reliable aviation powerplants.

A more reasonable project was the Hütter Hü 211, a design by Wolfgang Hütter that took a standard He 219 fuselage and tail and added a long-span, high aspect ratio wing of 24.55 m (80.54 ft) to create a fast, high altitude interceptor. Since this design was also meant to be powered by the ill-fated Jumo 222 it never flew, although work continued on two sets of wings until they were destroyed by Allied bombing.

The He 219 was the only piston-engined night fighter capable of facing the British Mosquito on equal terms, given its speed, manoeuvrability and firepower, but it never played a significant role in the war because the industry failed to make it available in sufficient numbers.

Variants
He 219 A-0
Initially used for pre-production aircraft but became first major production version with 1,750 PS DB 603A engines, 104 built as of 30 November 1944,
He 219 A-1
Proposed reconnaissance-bomber aircraft; project abandoned
He 219 A-2
Similar to A-0 but extended engine nacelles with additional fuel tanks, 1,670 PS DB 603AA engines, 85 built as of 30 November 1944
He 219 A-5
Planned three-seat night fighter, only some prototypes known to have been built from A-2 airframes
He 219 A-6
Planned Mosquito-hunter, stripped-down version of the He 219 A-2, armed with four 20 mm MG 151/20s
He 219 A-7
Improved night fighter version, powered by two 1,800 PS DB 603E engines, 210 ordered as of 30 November 1944
He 219 D-1
He 219 A-7 airframes adapted for Jumo 213E engines, five known to be delivered in 1945
He 319
An unbuilt multi-role aircraft project entirely unrelated to the He 219; only having the number sequence in common
He 419
Various derived projects culminating in He 419 B-1/R1, six of which were flown; use of the He 319 tail, very long-span wing of 59 square metres (635 sq ft), two 20 mm MG 151/20 in the wings and four 30 mm MK 108 in ventral housing.
Letov LB-79
Two He219s built from recovered components in Czechoslovakia during 1950, with one being used as a jet engine test-bed.

Operators

 Czechoslovak Air Force (Postwar)

 Luftwaffe

Surviving aircraft

When the war had ended in Europe, the U.S. Army Air Forces Intelligence Service, as part of "Operation Lusty" (LUftwaffe Secret TechnologY), took control of three He 219s at the Grove base of the 1st Night Fighter Wing (Nachtjagdgeschwader 1) in Jutland, Denmark starting on 16 June 1945. These aircraft were made flight-worthy by "Watson's Whizzers" and flown to Cherbourg, France. He 219 A-2 Werknummer 290202 was shipped to the United States with 21 other captured German aircraft on board the British escort carrier , and was reassembled at Newark Army Air Field, Newark, New Jersey.

Werknummer 290202 was given the foreign equipment number FE-614, and later T2-614. The aircraft was flown to Freeman Field, Indiana for flight testing along with a second of the three He 219s: a He 219 A-5 prototype, Werknummer 290060 and given the foreign equipment number FE-612. The fate of Werknummer 290060 is unknown. Following testing, He 219 A-2 Werknummer 290202 was then moved to Orchard Place Airport in Park Ridge, Illinois in 1946. It was stored in a vacant aircraft factory and then transferred to the Smithsonian's National Air Museum on 3 January 1949. Finally, the He 219 was crated and shipped to the Smithsonian's Silver Hill, Maryland storage facility in early 1955.

By August 2014 the wing structure (without control surfaces fitted) had been essentially restored, and was ready for the trip to the NASM's Udvar-Hazy shops within its integral Mary Baker Engen Restoration Hangar, to join the fuselage and engine nacelles there, with replacement Hirschgeweih VHF-band radar antenna components to be fabricated, based on a preserved example located in Europe and loaned to the NASM for replication, as part of the ongoing restoration process. The repainted wings were displayed during the 30 January 2016 open house in the restoration hangar paint shack.

He 219 A-2 Werknummer 290202 is currently restored and on display at the Steven F. Udvar-Hazy Center by Dulles Airport. Previously only the fuselage, empennage, and engines were on display, while the wings were stored at the Paul Garber Facility in Silver Hill, Maryland. As of 2021 the restored and assembled aircraft, including its wings, nacelles (possibly as Heinkel-designed specific, Kraftei unitized powerplant installations), and partially restored DB 603 engines (missing propellers) can be seen displayed next the museum's Arado Ar 234 and Dornier Do 335, the only surviving examples of those aircraft, both of which accompanied WkNr. 290202 across the Atlantic over 60 years ago.

In April 2012, a previously unknown He 219 was salvaged from the sea bed, 100 meters from the beach, north of Hirtshals, Denmark. The remains are in several pieces, but will undergo restoration and eventually be displayed at Aalborg, Denmark. Although severely damaged and missing many parts, the remains of this aircraft was preserved and then put on display at the Forsvars- og Garnisonsmuseum in Aalborg, Denmark. In August 2015 it was announced that the wreckage had been sold to an Austrian enthusiast for further restoration.

Specifications (He 219 A-7)

See also

References

Sources

 Berliner, Don. Surviving Fighter Aircraft of World War Two: Fighters. London: Pen & Sword Aviation, 2011. .
 Boyne, Walter J. Clash of Wings. New York: Simon & Schuster, 1994. .
 
 Bridgeman, Leonard (editor). "Heinkel He 219". Jane’s Fighting Aircraft of World War II. London: Studio, 1946. .
 Chorley, W.R. Royal Air Force Bomber Command Losses of the Second World War, Volume 5, 1944: Amendments and Additions. London: Ian Allan Publishing, 1997. .
 Chorley, W.R. Royal Air Force Bomber Command Losses of the Second World War, Volume 6, 1945: Amendments and additions. London: Ian Allan Publishing, 2004. .
 Franks, Norman L.R. Royal Air Force Fighter Command Losses of the Second World War: Volume 3. Operational Losses: Aircraft and Crews 1944–1945 (Incorporating Air Defence Great Britain and 2nd TAF): 1944–1945. Hersham, Surrey, UK: Midland Publishing, 2000. .
 Green, William. Warplanes of the Third Reich. London: Macdonald and Jane's Publishers Ltd., Fourth edition 1979, First edition 1970. .
 Green, William and Gordon Swanborough. "Heinkel's Nocturnal Predator... The He 219". Air Enthusiast, Issue Forty, September–December 1989, pp. 8–19, 70–72. Bromley, Kent: Tri-Service Press.
 Greenhous, Brereton. The Crucible of War: 1939–1945. Toronto: University of Toronto Press, 1994. .
 Griehl, Manfred and Joachim Dressel. Heinkel He 177 – 277 – 274. Shrewsbury, UK: Airlife Publishing, 1998. .
 Kay, Anthony and John Richard Smith. German Aircraft of the Second World War: Including Helicopters and Missiles (Putnam's History of Aircraft). London: Putnam, 2002. .
 Nowarra, Heinz J. Heinkel He 219 "Uhu". Atglen, Pennsylvania: Schiffer Publishing Inc., 1989. .
 Remp, Roland. Heinkel He 219: An Illustrated History of Germany's Premier Nightfighter. Atglen, Pennsylvania: Schiffer Publishing Inc., 2007. .
 Smith, J.R. and Antony L. Kay. German Aircraft of the Second World War. London: Putnam, 1972. .
 Wagner, Ray and Heinz Nowarra. German Combat Planes. New York: Doubleday, 1971.

External links

 "Tour the Last Remaining Heinkel He 219": Heinkel 219 A-0, FE 614, before its completed fuselage restoration to display condition-article's date is 1997 
 He 219A-0 Pilot's Manual – in German
 Photopage of the recovered He 219A in Denmark
 The Smithsonian's "A Rare Restoration Project" Video of their He 219A-2's wing structure evaluation
 Photo-montage of the Smithsonian's He 219A 290 202, with many detail shots, including the Kraftei-unitized DB 603 engines

1940s German fighter aircraft
He 219
World War II night fighter aircraft of Germany
High-wing aircraft
Aircraft first flown in 1942
Twin piston-engined tractor aircraft
Twin-tail aircraft